Charles Durham may refer to:

 Charles Durham (Neighbours), a character from the soap opera Neighbours
 Chuck Durham (1918–2008), American civil engineer, philanthropist and civic leader